Madison Academic Magnet High School is a public high school in the Jackson Madison County School System located on Lambuth Boulevard and formerly located on Allen Avenue, in Jackson, Tennessee. The former building was erected in 1928 as Jackson High School and underwent extensive renovations during the summer of 2003. The school was started in the autumn of 2003, replacing the former west campus of Jackson Central-Merry High School. The new building was constructed in late 2020 and opened in January 2022. The school has a graduating class of fewer than 125 students and does not offer special education classes. It is ranked #15 in Best High Schools in Tennessee according to U.S. News & World Report.

The principal of Madison Academic is Chad Guthrie. The school's course offerings are honors and college-prep courses. Although students do apply for admission, no academic criteria influences selection, as selection is through a lottery system. Once enrolled, students must maintain a C average to remain at the school.

References

External links
Madison Academic Magnet High School website

Educational institutions established in 2003
Public high schools in Tennessee
Schools in Madison County, Tennessee
Jackson, Tennessee
Magnet schools in Tennessee
2003 establishments in Tennessee